Songtsen Gampo (569–649? 650), also Songzan Ganbu, was the 33rd Tibetan king and founder of the Tibetan Empire, and is traditionally credited with the introduction of Buddhism to Tibet, influenced by his Nepali consort Bhrikuti, of Nepal's Licchavi dynasty, as well as with the unification of what had previously been several Tibetan kingdoms. He is also regarded as responsible for the creation of the Tibetan script and therefore the establishment of Classical Tibetan, the language spoken in his region at the time, as the literary language of Tibet.

His mother, the queen, is identified as Driza Thökar. The date of his birth and of when he took the throne are not certain. In Tibetan accounts, it is generally accepted that he was born in an Ox year of the Tibetan calendar, which means one of the following dates: 557, 569, 581, 593, 605 or 617 CE. He is thought to have ascended the throne at age thirteen (twelve by Western reckoning), by this reckoning c. 629.

There are difficulties with this position, however, and several earlier dates for the birth of Songtsen Gampo have been suggested, including 569, 593 or 605.

Early life and cultural background

It is said that Songtsen Gampo was born at Gyama in Meldro, a region to the northeast of modern Lhasa, the son of the Yarlung king Namri Songtsen. The book The Holder of the White Lotus says that it is believed that he was a manifestation of Avalokiteśvara, of whom the Dalai Lamas are similarly believed to be a manifestation. His identification as a cakravartin and incarnation of Avalokiteśvara began in earnest in the indigenous Buddhist literary histories of the 11th century.

Family
Some Dunhuang documents say that, as well as his sister Sad-mar-kar (or Sa-tha-ma-kar), Songtsen Gampo had a younger brother who was betrayed and died in a fire, sometime after 641. Apparently, according to one partially damaged scroll from Dunhuang, there was hostility between Sa-tha-ma-kar and Songtsen Gampo's younger brother, bTzan-srong, who, as a result, was forced to settle in gNyal (an old district to the southeast of Yarlung and across the  Yartö Tra Pass, which bordered on modern Bhutan and Arunachal Pradesh in India). Little, if anything, else is known about this brother.

Songtsen Gampo's mother, the queen, is identified as a member of the Tsépong clan (Tibetan Annals ), which played an important part in the unification of Tibet. Her name is recorded variously but is identified as Driza Tökar ("the Bri Wife [named] White Skull Woman", Tibetan Annals ).

Songtsen Gampo had six consorts, of whom four are considered "native" and two - the well-known ones - foreign. Highest-ranking was Pogong Mongza Tricham (also called Mongza, "the Mong clan wife", who is said to have been the mother of Gungsong Gungtsen. Other notable wives include a noble woman of the Western Xia known as Minyakza ("Western Xia wife"), and a noble woman from Zhangzhung. Well-known even today are his two 'foreign' wives: the Nepali princess Bhrikuti ("the great lady, the Nepalese wife") as well as the Chinese Princess Wencheng ("Chinese Wife"). These two wives are credited in Tibetan tradition in playing crucial roles in the adoption of Buddhism in Tibet and held to explain the two great influences on Tibetan Buddhism, Indo-Nepali and Chinese.

Songtsen Gampo's heir, Gungsong Gungtsen, died before his father, so his son, Mangsong Mangtsen, took the throne. His mother is sometimes said to have been a Chinese princess but this is thought to be highly unlikely. His mother was most probably Mangmoje Trikar, who is mentioned in the Genealogy found in the hidden library in the caves in Dunhuang, the Tibetan Annals, which list the names of the Tibetan emperors and the names of their consorts who bore future emperors, and the clans they came from).

Some accounts say that when Gungsong Gungtsen reached the age of thirteen (twelve by Western reckoning), his father, Songtsen Gampo, retired, and he ruled for five years (which could have been the period when Songtsen Gampo was working on the new constitution). Gungsong Gungtsen is also said to have married 'A-zha Mang-mo-rje when he was thirteen, and they had a son, Mangsong Mangtsen (r. 650-676 CE). Gungsong Gungtsen is said to have only ruled for five years when he died at eighteen. His father, Songtsen Gampo, took the throne again. Gungsong Gungtsen is said to have been buried at Donkhorda, the site of the royal tombs, to the left of the tomb of his grandfather Namri Songtsen (gNam-ri Srong-btsan). The dates for these events are very unclear.
According to Tibetan tradition, Songtsen Gampo was enthroned while still a minor as the thirty-third king of the Yarlung dynasty after his father was poisoned circa 618. He is said to have been born in an unspecified Ox year and was 13 years old (12 by Western reckoning) when he took the throne. This accords with the tradition that the Yarlung kings took the throne when they were 13, and supposedly old enough to ride a horse and rule the kingdom. If these traditions are correct, he was probably born in the Ox year 605 CE. The Old Book of Tang notes that he "was still a minor when he succeeded to the throne."

The current head of the Royal House of Tibet and king in exile is a direct descendant of the Dharma kings   and crowned King of Tibet by Tenzin Gyatso, 14th Dalai Lama is His Majesty King Lhagyari Trichen Namgyal Wangchuk
The King lives in the United States and travels the world speaking out for the human and religious rights of the Tibetan people, under the occupation of the People's Republic of China.

Cultural activities
Songtsen Gampo is said to have sent his minister Thonmi Sambhota to India to devise a script for Classical Tibetan, which led to the creation of the first Tibetan literary works and translations, court records and a constitution. After Thonmi Sambhota returned from India, Songtsen Gampo stayed in a cave for three years with Thonmi Sambhota to learn whatever he had learned in India.

Songtsen Gampo moved the seat of his newly unified kingdom from the Yarlung Valley to the Kyichu Valley, site of the future city of Lhasa. The site itself was originally a herding ground called Rasa ("the place of goats") but the name was changed to Lhasa ("the place of gods") on the king's founding of the Jokhang Temple. The name Lhasa itself originally referred simply to the temple precincts.

He is also credited with bringing many new cultural and technological advances to Tibet. The Jiu Tangshu, or Old Book of Tang, states that after the defeat in 648 of an Indian army in support of Chinese envoys, the Chinese Emperor, Gaozong, a devout Buddhist, gave him the title variously written Binwang, "Guest King" or Zongwang, "Cloth-tribute King" and 3,000 rolls of multicoloured silk in 649 and granted the Tibetan king's request for "silkworms' eggs, mortars and presses for making wine, and workmen to manufacture paper and ink."

Traditional accounts say that, during the reign of Songtsen Gampo, examples of handicrafts and astrological systems were imported from China and the Western Xia; the dharma and the art of writing came from India; material wealth and treasures from the Nepalis and the lands of the Mongols, while model laws and administration were imported from the Uyghurs of the Second Turkic Khaganate to the North.

Introduction of Buddhism

Songtsen Gampo is traditionally credited with being the first to bring Buddhism to the Tibetan people. He is also said to have built many Buddhist temples, including the Jokhang in Lhasa, the city in which he is credited in one tradition with founding and establishing as his capital, and Tradruk Temple in Nêdong. During his reign, the translation of Buddhist texts from Sanskrit into Tibetan began.

Songtsen Gampo is considered to be the first of the three Dharma Kings — Songtsen Gampo, Trisong Detsen, and Ralpacan — who established Buddhism in Tibet.

The inscription on the Skar cung Pillar (erected by Ralpacan, who ruled c. 800–815) reports that during Songtsen Gampo's reign, "shrines of the Three Jewels were established by building the temple of Ra-sa [Lhasa] and so on." The first edict of Trisong Detsen mentions a community of monks at this vihara.

620s
Songtsen Gampo was adept at diplomacy as well as on the field of battle. The king's minister, Nyang Mangpoje Shangnang, with the aid of troops from Zhangzhung, defeated the Sumpa in northeastern Tibet circa 627 (Tibetan Annals [OTA] l. 2).

630s
Six years later (c. 632/633), Myang Mang-po-rje Zhang-shang was accused of treason and executed (OTA l. 4–5, Richardson 1965). Minister Mgar-srong-rtsan succeeded him.

The Jiu Tangshu records that the first ever embassy from Tibet arrived in China from Songtsen Gampo in the 8th Zhenguan year, or 634 CE. Tang dynasty chronicles describe this as a tribute mission, but it brought an ultimatum demanding a marriage alliance, not subservient rituals. After this demand was refused, Tibet launched victorious military attacks against Tang affiliates in 637 and 638.

The conquest of Zhang Zhung

There is some confusion as to whether Central Tibet conquered Zhangzhung during the reign of Songtsen Gampo or in the reign of Trisong Detsen (r. 755 until 797 or 804 CE). The Old Book of Tang do seems to place these events clearly in the reign of Songtsen Gampo, for they say that in 634, Yangtong (Zhangzhung) and various Qiang peoples "altogether submitted to him." Following this, he united with the country of Yangtong to defeat the 'Azha, or Tuyuhun, and then conquered two more tribes of Qiang before threatening Songzhou with an army of (according to the Chinese) more than 200,000 men (100,000 according to Tibetan sources). He then sent an envoy with gifts of gold and silk to the Chinese emperor to ask for a Chinese princess in marriage and, when refused, attacked Songzhou. According to the Tang annals, he finally retreated and apologised, and, later, the emperor granted his request, but the histories written in Tibet all say that the Tibetan army defeated the Chinese and that the Tang emperor delivered a bride under threat of force.

Early Tibetan accounts say that the Tibetan king and the king of Zhangzhung had married each other's sisters in a political alliance. However, the Tibetan wife of the king of the Zhangzhung complained of poor treatment by the king's principal wife. War ensued, and, through the treachery of the Tibetan princess, "King Ligmikya of Zhangzhung, while on his way to Sum-ba (Amdo province) was ambushed and killed by King Srongtsen Gampo's soldiers. As a consequence, The Zhangzhung kingdom was annexed to Bod [Central Tibet]. Thereafter the new kingdom born of the unification of Zhangzhung and Bod was known as Bod rGyal-khab." R. A. Stein places the conquest of Zhangzhung in 645.

Further campaigns
He next attacked and defeated the Tangut people who later formed the Western Xia state in 942 CE), the Bailang, and Qiang tribes. The Bailan people were bounded on the east by the Tanguts and on the west by the Domi. They had been subject to the Chinese since 624.

After a successful campaign against China in the frontier province of Songzhou in 635–36 (OTA l. 607), the Chinese emperor agreed to send a Chinese princess for Songtsen Gampo to marry.

Around 639, after Songtsen Gampo had a dispute with his younger brother Tsensong, the younger brother was burnt to death by his own minister, Khasek, possibly at the behest of the emperor.

640s 
The Old Book of Tang records that when the king of 泥婆羅, Nipoluo ("Nepal"), the father of Licchavi king Naling Deva (or Narendradeva), died, an uncle, Yu.sna kug.ti, Vishnagupta) usurped the throne. "The Tibetans gave him refuge and reestablished him on his throne [in 641]; that is how he became subject to Tibet."

Sometime later, but still within the Zhenguan period (627-650 CE), the Tibetans sent an envoy to present day Nepal, where the king received him "joyfully", and, later, when a Tibetan mission was attacked in present-day India by then minister of emperor Harshavardhan who had usurped the throne after emperor Harshavardhan's death around 647 AD, the Licchavi king came to their aid. Songtsen Gampo married Princess Bhrikuti, the daughter of King Licchavi.

The Chinese Princess Wencheng, niece of the Emperor Taizong of Tang, left China in 640 to marry Songtsen Gampo, arriving the next year. Peace between China and Tibet prevailed for the remainder of Songtsen Gampo's reign.

Both wives are considered to have been incarnations of Tara, the Goddess of Compassion, the female aspect of Chenrezig, where "Dolma, or Drolma (Sanskrit means Tara). As Sarat Chaundra explains, the two wives of Emperor Srong-btsan gambo are venerated under this name. The Chinese princess is called Dol-kar, of 'the white Dolma,' and the Nepalese princess Dol-jang, or 'the green Dolma.' The latter is prayed to by women for fecundity."

The Jiu Tangshu adds that Songtsen Gampo thereupon built a city for the Chinese princess, and a palace for her within its walls. According to Chinese sources, "As the princess disliked their custom of painting their faces red, Lungstan (Songtsen Gampo) ordered his people to put a stop to the practice, and it was no longer done. He also discarded his felt and skins, put on brocade and silk, and gradually copied Chinese civilization. He also sent the children of his chiefs and rich men to request admittance into the national school to be taught the classics, and invited learned scholars from China to compose his official reports to the emperor."

However, according to Tibetologist John Powers, such accounts of Tibet embracing Chinese culture through Wencheng are not corroborated by Tibetan histories.

Songtsen Gampo's sister Sad-mar-kar was sent to marry Lig-myi-rhya, the king of Zhangzhung. However, when the king refused to consummate the marriage, she then helped Songtsen Gampo to defeat Lig myi-rhya and incorporate the Zhangzhung of Western Tibet into the Tibetan Empire in 645, thus gaining control of most, if not all, of the Tibetan plateau.

Following the visit by the famous Chinese pilgrim monk Xuanzang to the court of Harsha, the king ruling Magadha, Harsha sent a mission to China which, in turn, responded by sending an embassy consisting of Li Yibiao and Wang Xuance, who probably travelled through Tibet and whose journey is commemorated in inscriptions at Rajagrha - modern Rajgir – and Bodhgaya.

Wang Xuanze made a second journey in 648, but he was badly treated by Harsha's usurper, his minister Arjuna, and Harsha's mission plundered. This elicited a response from Tibetan and Nepalese (Licchavi) troops who, together, soundly defeated Arjuna's forces.

In 649, the King of Xihai Jun was conferred upon Songtsen Gampo by Tang Gaozong, the emperor of the Tang dynasty.

According to the Tibetan Annals, Songtsen Gampo must have died in 649, and, in 650, the Tang emperor sent an envoy with a "letter of mourning and condolences". His tomb is in the Chongyas Valley near Yalung, 13 metres high and 130 metres long.

Notes

References

Citations

Sources

External links 
 http://www.asianart.com/articles/jaya/kings.html A list of Licchavi kings and their attributed dates, from: "A Kushan-period Sculpture from the reign of Jaya Varma-, A.D. 184/185. Kathmandu, Nepal." Kashinath Tamot and Ian Alsop. See: http://www.asianart.com/articles/jaya/index01_12.html

Tibetan emperors
Buddhist monarchs
7th-century rulers in Asia
7th-century births
649 deaths
7th-century Tibetan people
Child monarchs from Asia
Date of birth unknown
7th-century Buddhists
Deified people
Founding monarchs